The KU-KSU-WSU Triangular or the Sunflower Triangular is an indoor track and field contest between the three NCAA Division I track and field programs in the state of Kansas: The University of Kansas, Kansas State University, and Wichita State University. The triangular has been an annual event since 2015. Scoring for the meet is 7 – 5 – 4 – 3 – 2 – 1 (Relay 7 – 5 – 4) with only two athletes per institution counting in each event. The meet rotates between the three schools with each institution hosting the event every three years.

References

Annual track and field meetings
College track and field competitions in the United States
Sports in Kansas
Track and field in Kansas